Fred Allen is a  member of the Arkansas House of Representatives, and a cancer survivor, known for appearing in a commercial campaign for Cancer Treatment Centers of America.

Allen received a degree in business administration from Middle Tennessee State University and served as an administrative aide in the office of U.S. Senator David Pryor. Allen was first elected to the state legislature in 2006, representing District 33, in Little Rock, Arkansas, and drew the best number for assigned seniority among new members. In 2011, Allen filed a bill to develop an insurance exchange in the state, but pulled it after a compromise bill was reached with Republicans. In 2017, Allen filed a bill in the Arkansas House to raise the minimum age for purchasing tobacco products to 21.

References

External links
 Cancer Treatment Centers of America profile of Fred Allen
 Arkansas House of Representatives profile of Fred Allen

Democratic Party members of the Arkansas House of Representatives
Year of birth missing (living people)
Living people
21st-century American politicians